The 1987 Jarama 4 Hours was the second round of the inaugural World Touring Car Championship. The race was held for cars eligible for Group A touring car regulations. It was held on April 19, 1987, at the Circuit of Jarama, in Madrid, Spain.

The race was won by Emanuele Pirro and Roberto Ravaglia, driving a BMW M3.

Class structure
Cars were divided into three classes based on engine capacity:
 Division 1: 1-1600cc
 Division 2: 1601-2500cc
 Division 3: Over 2500cc

Official results
Results were as follows:
| Entered: 29
| Started: 29
| Finished: 17

 Drivers in italics practiced in the car but did not take part in the race.

See also
 1987 World Touring Car Championship

References

1987 in Spanish motorsport
1987 World Touring Car Championship season